Bayou Chicot is an unincorporated community in Evangeline Parish, Louisiana, United States. It is located due north of Ville Platte.

About
Bayou Chicot is home to Chicot State Park, which features the largest man-made lake in the state. Also in the community is Mountain Bayou Lake Boy Scout Camp, which was established in 1980, and is now a well known camp throughout the states of Louisiana and Texas.

Government
Bayou Chicot also has a volunteer fire department controlled by the Ward Five Fire District.
The people in this area have been known to be called stump jumpers due to the name chicot which means stump.

Education
Public schools in Evangeline Parish are operated by the Evangeline Parish School Board. Bayou Chicot Elementary School is located in the community of Bayou Chicot and serves students in grades pre-kindergarten through eighth. Area high school students attend Pine Prairie High School in Pine Prairie.

Unincorporated communities in Evangeline Parish, Louisiana
Unincorporated communities in Louisiana